Sacred is the Los Lonely Boys' fourth album and their second studio set, released on July 18, 2006. The original title of the album, as shown on the "Diamonds" single printed materials was to be "Òralé". "Diamonds", a revised version of the same song from the 1997 album, was the first single to be released on May 8, 2006. This was followed by the single release of "My Way".

The album features a fuller sound than the earlier album, primarily due to extra instruments. The button accordion is prominently featured on "Texican Style", and harmonica on "Home". There are horn accompaniments (trumpet, tenor and baritone sax) on several songs, including "My Way".

Willie Nelson and the band members' father, Enrique Garza, both perform on "Outlaws". Patrick Simmons of the Doobie Brothers is a co-author of "Roses".

Track listing
"My Way" – 4:24
"Órale" – 3:44
"Diamonds" – 3:14
"Oyé Mamacita" – 3:31
"I Never Met a Woman" – 4:46
"Roses" – 3:51
"Texican Style" – 4:04
"One More Day" – 3:36
"Memories" – 4:10
"My Loneliness" – 4:44
"Outlaws" – 4:41
"Home" – 3:40
"Living My Life" – 4:26

Personnel
Los Lonely Boys
Henry Garza - guitar, vocals
Jojo Garza - bass guitar, vocals
Ringo Garza - drums, percussion, vocals

Additional
Lenny Castro  percussion
Erik Darken - percussion
Mike Finnegan - organ, piano, keyboards
Enrique Garza Sr. - vocals
Al Gomez - trumpet
Michael Guerra Button - accordion
Jimmy Hall - harmonica
Mark "Kaz" Kazanoff - tenor saxophone
Darrell Leonard - trumpet, trombone
John H.R. Mills - baritone saxophone
Willie Nelson - vocals, guitar
Carl Perazzo - percussion
John Porter - guitar
Joe Sublett - tenor saxophone
Rese Wynans - organ
Randy Zimmerman - trombone

References

2006 albums
Los Lonely Boys albums
Epic Records albums
Albums produced by Mark Wright (record producer)